The ICOM IC-7300 is a multimode 6 meter and HF base station amateur radio transceiver. The IC-7300 was announced to the public at the Japan Ham Fair in 2015. The radio has 100 watts output on CW, SSB, and FM modulations and 25 watts of output in AM. Although not the first SDR radio on the market The IC-7300 was the first mass-produced mainstream amateur radios to use SDR technology instead of the older superheterodyne transceiver design. Designed to replace the older IC-746PRO the IC-7300 is smaller and significantly lighter than its predecessor. Like many other radios of its class the IC-7300 has an internal antenna tuner and contains an internal audio card accessible over USB. This allows the radio to be used for popular digital modes such as PSK31, Winlink, and FT8. The radio has received praise for its easy to use menus, large readable screen, and excellent audio processing.

Specifications 
Specifications of the ICOM IC-7300 are:

 Frequency range: Tx: 1.8 – 54 MHz (amateur bands only) Rx: 30 kHz – 74.80 MHz
 Modes of emission: A1A (CW), A3E (AM), J3E (LSB, USB), F3E (FM)
 Impedance: SO-239 50 Ohms, unbalanced
 Supply voltage: 13.8 VDC
 Current consumption: Rx: 1.25 A Tx: 21 A
 Case size (WxHxD): 240×94×238 mm; 9.45×3.7×9.37 in
 Weight (approx.): 4.2 kg; 9.26 lb
 Output power: 100 W (Adjustable 5-100 Watts) SSB/CW/FM (AM: 2 5W - Adjustable 5-25 Watts)
 Transmitter modulation
 SSB : Digital phase-shift network (PSN) modulation
 AM : Digital low power modulation
 FM : Digital phase modulation

External links 

 Official ICOM website
 ICOM IC-7300 website

References 

Amateur radio transceivers